The 2021–22 Macedonian Third Football League was the 30th season of the third-tier football league in North Macedonia, since its establishment.

The season in the north group was cancelled due to the COVID-19-rules disagreements between the clubs and the league.

South 
Note: Napredok Krusheani were withdraw before the start of season

Table

East

Table

West

Table

Southwest

Table

Promotion play-offs

See also 
 2021–22 Macedonian Football Cup
 2021–22 Macedonian First Football League
 2021–22 Macedonian Second Football League

References 

Macedonian Third Football League seasons
North Macedonia 3
3